Wrist strap can mean:
 a lanyard worn around the wrist
 a watch strap
 an anti-static wrist strap

See also 
 Wristband
 Wrist brace
 Wrist guard
 Wristlet